STTEP International is a private military company founded in 2006. Their name reflecting their expertise in Specialised Tasks, Training, Equipment and Protection. STTEP was hired by the Nigerian government in 2015 to provide military training for the offensive against Boko Haram. Its former chairman, Eeben Barlow, who resigned 30 September 2020, was the founder of the South African PMC Executive Outcomes, which ceased operations in 1998.

Though the company remains secretive about its contracts, it claims to have operated throughout Africa, the Far East, the Middle East and Central America.

References

Private military contractors
Companies of Gibraltar
Business services companies established in 2006